Dato' Haji Zainol Fadzi Paharudin (born 31 July 1966) is a Malaysian politician. He is the incumbent Perak State Legislative Assemblyman for Sungai Manik since 2008. He is a member of Malaysian United Indigenous Party (BERSATU), a component party of Perikatan Nasional (PN) coalition.

Zainol Fadzi was previously the Perak United Malays National Organisation (UMNO) Youth Chief, the State Public Utilities, Infrastructure, Energy and Water Committee Chairman (EXCO) in the previous Barisan Nasional (BN) Perak state government and the BN assemblyman for Sungai Manik into the third term since 2008 general election before he resigned from UMNO on 14 May 2018. He initially became independent aligned with the ruling party PH coalition and later joined its component BERSATU. Then he was appointed on 8 June 2018 as the Adviser to Perak Menteri Besar Ahmad Faizal Azumu of the new PH state government formed after the 2018 general election.

Zainol Fadzi is also the former President Perak Football Association (PAFA) from 2010 to 2015.

Education background
Zainol Fadzi obtained his Diploma In Business Studies (Marketing) at Mara Technology University in 1987 and Diploma In Business Engineering Management at Universiti Teknologi Malaysia in 1992.

Election results

Honours

Honours of Malaysia
  :
  Officer of the Order of the Defender of the Realm (KMN) (2012)
  :
 Knight of the Order of Cura Si Manja Kini (DPCM) - Dato' (2010)
  :
  Member of the Exalted Order of Malacca (DSM)
  :
  Companion of the Order of Kinabalu (ASDK)

References

1966 births
Living people
People from Perak
Malaysian people of Malay descent
Malaysian Muslims
Malaysian United Indigenous Party politicians
Former United Malays National Organisation politicians
Independent politicians in Malaysia
Members of the Perak State Legislative Assembly
Perak state executive councillors
21st-century Malaysian politicians